The Brazilian snake-necked turtle (Hydromedusa maximiliani ), locally known as cágado da serra, and also commonly known as Maximilian's snake-necked turtle, is a species of turtle in the family Chelidae. The species is endemic to southeastern Brazil. The species prefers streams with sandy and rocky bottoms and clear water in forests above  elevation.

Etymology
The specific name, maximiliani, is in honor of German naturalist Prince Maximilian of Wied-Neuwied.

Taxonomy
First described as Emys maximiliani by Mikan (1825), it was subsequently moved to the genus Hydromedusa by Wagler (1830). Several other species described later have since been synonymized with this species. There are no recognised subspecies.

Description
The carapace of the adult is oval in shape varying in color from dark gray, through to dark or light brown. The plastron is a yellow or cream color. The species has a moderate-sized head with a small snout and yellowish jaws, with no barbels on the chin. The iris is black. The dorsal surface of the head, neck and limbs are olive green to gray in color with a lighter cream-colored ventral surface.

Distribution and habitat
The Brazilian snake-necked turtle is endemic to southeastern Brazil, in the states of Bahia, Minas Gerais, Espírito Santo, Rio de Janeiro and São Paulo. The distribution is associated with the mountainous Atlantic rainforest. As a generalization it is found in mountain streams above .

Because of the dense canopy and closed understory of the forests the streams receive little sunlight making basking only possible in gaps along the stream.

Conservation
Some populations of this species, H. maximiliani, occur within protected areas and are hence afforded some protection from deforestation and pollution which are considered major threats. In regions outside these protected areas the species may be becoming fragmented and may therefore become increasingly vulnerable in the future.

References

"Hydromedusa maximiliani".IUCN Red List of Threatened Species.1996

Hydromedusa
Reptiles of Brazil
Endemic fauna of Brazil
Reptiles described in 1825
Taxonomy articles created by Polbot